Rhenish Hesse or Rhine Hesse is a region and a former government district in the German state of Rhineland-Palatinate. It is made up of territories west of the Upper Rhine river that were part of the Grand Duchy of Hesse and its successor in the Weimar Republic, the People's State of Hesse from 1816 to 1945. The hilly countryside is largely devoted to vineyards, comprising the Rheinhessen wine region.

Geography

Rhine Hesse stretches from the Upper Rhine Plain on the west bank of the Rhine up to the Nahe and Alsenz rivers in the west and down to the mouth of the Isenach in the south. The region borders on the Rhineland in the northwest, on the Palatinate in the southwest, and on South Hesse beyond the Rhine.

The Mainz Basin, a Cenozoic marine basin, covered the area about 38 to 12 million years ago. The landscape is characterised by large Loess and Marl deposits. Due to the favourable climatic conditions of Rhenish Hesse, agriculture covers most of the region. As the Hunsrück and Taunus ranges protect it from cold winds, wine and fruit production is practised on a large scale.

The region comprises the cities of Mainz – the Rhineland-Palatinate capital – and Worms, surrounded by the administrative districts of Mainz-Bingen and Alzey-Worms. Other towns include Bingen, Alzey, Nieder-Olm, Ingelheim, Nierstein, Oppenheim, and Osthofen. Many inhabitants commute to work in Mainz or Wiesbaden and Frankfurt in the neighbouring state of Hesse.

History
The importance of the Rhine Hessian lands increased when they were allotted to King Louis the German by the 843 Treaty of Verdun. The region was part of the core territory of Rhenish Franconia. It comprised the Imperial Cathedrals of Worms and Mainz which were erected in the High Middle Ages. The Worms Synagogue and the Jewish Cemetery count among the oldest in Europe. Devastated by the Thirty Years' War, the area became a patchwork of possessions of the Catholic Electorate of Mainz and the Prince-Bishopric of Worms as well as of the Protestant Electoral Palatinate.

Rhine Hesse was occupied by the First French Republic in 1792, during the War of the First Coalition. At the Congress of Vienna in 1814–15, Grand Duke Louis I of Hesse was obliged to give up his Westphalian territories. In compensation, he received the district on the left bank of the Rhine. Because of this addition, he amended his title to Grand Duke of Hesse and by Rhine and the name of the region was created. In Allied-occupied Germany, the Rhine Hessian lands were incorporated as a district into the newly established state of Rhineland-Palatinate in 1946.

Cuisine

Each region has developed its own cuisine dependent on geography, climate, soils, seasons and wealth. These vary from plain home cooking with simple dishes to culinary specialities for festive occasions. Rhine Hesse also has a large number of specialities, with Weck, Worscht un Woi, not least through the Mainz carnival, has achieved supra-regional fame.
 Backesbroode – a roast filled with potatoes and bacon
 Backesgrumbeere – spiced potato casserole with bacon, wine and sour cream
 Bremser or Bitzler – Federweißer
 Dibbehas – hare stew (Dibbe), with hare (wild hare, rabbit), spices and optionally with wine
 Asparagus (Gemüsespargel)
 Hackesweck – bread roll with highly spiced Mett (minced pork) and onions
 Handkäs with music – marinaded cheese, a Mainzer Roller marinaded in vinegar, oil and onions (music because of the subsequent flatulence)
 Kräppel, fried dough for Carnival
 Schales
 Spundekäs – consists of fresh cheese, paprika, onions and other spices
 Weck, Worscht un Woi, well known Rhine Hessian snack
 Weingelee (wine jelly)
 Weinsuppe (wine soup)
 Wingertsimbs – typical vineyard snack
 Wingertsknorze – rye bread roll with bacon and onions
 Woihinkelsche, originally from the Alsace (coq au vin à l’alsacienne), but must include chicken and white wine; not to be confused with the Weinhähnchen, an insect
 Zwiwwelkuche – Zwiebelkuchen

Wine growing

Rhine Hesse is the largest of 13 regions producing German wine. Outside Germany, it is best known as the home of Liebfraumilch. Most is made from white varieties such as  Riesling, Silvaner, Müller-Thurgau, Kerner, and Scheurebe.  The best-known white wine area is the Rhine Terrace near Oppenheim and Nierstein. Some red varieties are grown, particularly around Ingelheim and Gundersheim, including Pinot noir, Blauer Portugieser, Dornfelder, and the recently established Regent.

References

External links
 Official website of Rhine Hesse, with information about wine, tourism, and culture (in German)
 Website on the history of Rhine Hesse (in German)

 
Former states and territories of Rhineland-Palatinate
Former states and territories of Hesse
Grand Duchy of Hesse
Former government regions of Germany